14968 Kubáček, provisional designation , is a stony background asteroid from the middle region of the asteroid belt, approximately 5 kilometers in diameter. The asteroid was discovered on 23 August 1997, by Slovak astronomers Adrián Galád and Alexander Pravda at Modra Observatory, Slovakia. It was named for Slovak astronomer Dalibor Kubáček.

Orbit and classification 

Kubáček orbits the Sun in the central main-belt at a distance of 2.3–2.8 AU once every 4 years and 1 month (1,501 days). Its orbit has an eccentricity of 0.10 and an inclination of 5° with respect to the ecliptic.

Physical characteristics

Rotation period 

A rotational lightcurve of Kubáček was obtained from photometric observations made by the discovering astronomer Adrián Galád at Modra Observatory in April 2008. The lightcurve showed a rotation period of  hours with a brightness variation of 0.48 in magnitude.

Diameter and albedo 

According to the survey carried out by NASA's space-based Wide-field Infrared Survey Explorer with its subsequent NEOWISE mission, Kubáček measures 4.8 kilometers in diameter and its surface has an albedo of 0.21, while the Collaborative Asteroid Lightcurve Link assumes a standard albedo for stony asteroids of 0.20 and calculates a diameter of 4.7 kilometers.

Naming 

This minor planet was named in honor of astronomer Dalibor Kubáček (born 1957), who explored the coma of comets at the Slovak Academy of Sciences in Bratislava. He readily instructed the peculiar methods of image processing to students and friends, as well as to the discoverers of this minor planet. The official naming citation was published by the Minor Planet Center on 27 April 2002.

References

External links 
 Asteroid Lightcurve Database (LCDB), query form (info )
 Dictionary of Minor Planet Names, Google books
 Asteroids and comets rotation curves, CdR – Observatoire de Genève, Raoul Behrend
 Discovery Circumstances: Numbered Minor Planets (10001)-(15000) – Minor Planet Center
 
 

 

014968
Discoveries by Adrián Galád
Discoveries by Alexander Pravda
Named minor planets
19970823